Serhiy Vasylyovych Shevchenko (born 4 March 1958) is a former Soviet striker and a Ukrainian coach.

References
His profile 

1958 births
Living people
Sportspeople from Kherson
Soviet footballers
Ukrainian footballers
CSF Bălți players
MFC Mykolaiv players
FC Kakhovka players
FC Krystal Kherson players
FC Tavriya Novotroitske players
Ukrainian football managers
Ukrainian Premier League managers
FC Kakhovka managers
FC Sevastopol managers
SC Tavriya Simferopol managers
FC Naftovyk Okhtyrka managers
FC Krystal Kherson managers
FC Ihroservice Simferopol managers
Naturalised citizens of Russia
Association football forwards
Russian football managers
Crimean Premier League managers
FC TSK Simferopol managers